Zubair Ali Zai (25 June 195710 November 2013) was a preacher, theologian, Islamic scholar of ahadith and former merchant marine from Pakistan.

Life
Zubair Alizai was from the Pashtun tribe of Alizai, itself a branch of the larger Durrani confederation tracing their descent back to Ahmad Shah Durrani, founder of the Durrani Empire.

He was born in 1957 in the village of Pirdad, near Hazro in the Attock District of Punjab.

He married in 1982 and had three sons (Tahir, Abdullah Saqib and Muaz) and four daughters. In addition to his native language of Hindko and Arabic, he was also fluent in English, Urdu, Pashto and Greek, and could read and understand Persian.

Career

Education
Hafiz Zubair Alizai completed a bachelor's degree and later on two master's degrees, one in Islamic studies in 1983 and another in the Arabic language in 1994 from the University of the Punjab in Lahore. Additionally, he graduated for a fourth time from the Salafi University in Faisalabad.

Editing and publishing
Hafiz Zubair Alizai was, like his former teacher Rashidi, a bibliophile, having amassed a private library of some renown in Hazro, where he spent most of his time.

Works
Much of Hafiz Zubair Alizai's work consists of editing and referencing ancient texts of prophetic tradition and evaluating them according to the Categories of Hadith. Working with Dar us Salam, he has reviewed the Al-Kutub al-Sittah, considered canonical in Sunni Islam. He also authored many books written in Urdu and Arabic. A book named "Noor ul Enain fi Masalate Rafa-ul-Yadain" has a list of all his works.

List of his books (published):
 Anwar al Sunan Fi Tahqiq Aasar il Sunan 
 Anwaar ul Saheefah Fi Ahadees Zaheefa Min Sunnan e Arba'a
 Tohfatul Aqwiya Fi Tahqeeq Kitabul Zuhafa
 Tahqeeq Tafseer Ibn Kathir
 Tahqeeq Masael Muhammad Ibn Usman Ibn Abi Shaybah
 Tahqeeq wa Takhreej Juzz Ali Bin Muhammad Al-Himyari
 Tahqeeq wa Takhreej Kitabul Arbaʿīn Le Ibn Taymiyyah
 Al-Etihaaf Al-Basim Fi Tahqeeq wa Takhreej Muwatta Imam Malik Riwayatu Ibn ul-Qasim
 Tahqeeq wa Takhreej Hisnul Muslim
 Alfathul Mubeen Fi Tahqeeq Tabqaat Al-Mudaliseen
 Musafaha wa Mohaniqa Ke Ahkaam wa Masael
 Nabi Kareem ﷺ kay Lail wa Nahaar
 Taufeeq Al-Bari Fi Tatbeeq Al-Quran wa Saheeh Al-Bukhari
 Masla Fatiha Khalful Imam
 Juzz Rafahul Yadain
 Fazael Sahaba
 Noorul Enain Fi Masalate Asbaate Rafa-ul-Yadain

Hadith referencing
 Sahih Muslim of Muslim ibn al-Hajjaj. Riyadh: Dar us Salam Publications, 2007. 1st Ed. 7 volumes.
 Jami' at-Tirmidhi of Muhammad ibn 'Isa at-Tirmidhi. Riyadh: Dar us Salam Publications, 2007. 6 volumes.
 Al-Sunan al-Sughra of Al-Nasa'i. Riyadh: Dar us Salam Publications, 2008. 6 volumes.
 Sunan Abu Dawood of Abu Dawood. Riyadh: Dar us Salam Publications, 2008. 1st Ed. 5 volumes. Translated by Yasir Qadhi. 
 Sunan ibn Majah of Ibn Majah. Riyadh: Dar us Salam Publications, 2007. 1st Ed. 5 volumes.

Death
Hafiz Zubair Alizai died on 10 November 2013 in Benazir Bhutto Hospital in Rawalpindi, Pakistan of lung failure.

See also 

 Muhammad al-Bukhari
 Muslim ibn al-Hajjaj
 Malik ibn Anas
 Al-Shafi‘i
 Ahmad ibn Hanbal
 Ibn Taymiyyah
 Muhammad Nasiruddin al-Albani

References

1957 births
2013 deaths
20th-century imams
20th-century Muslim scholars of Islam
21st-century Muslim scholars of Islam
Arabic-language writers from Pakistan
Biographical evaluation scholars
Hadith scholars
Pakistan Merchant Navy
Pakistani imams
Pakistani Islamic religious leaders
Pakistani Sunni Muslim scholars of Islam
Pashtun people
People from Attock District
Sunni imams
Salafi Islamists
University of the Punjab alumni
Ahl-i Hadith people